Big Deal: A Year as a Professional Poker Player is a book by Anthony Holden. The book details a year Holden spent playing poker around the world, attempting to make a living, or at least a profit, from the endeavor.

The book details many things about the gamesmanship of poker.

An incident where a professional poker player cited the book as the impetus to become a pro is in the book's epilogue.

Holden has written a sequel, Bigger Deal: A Year Inside the Poker Boom.

References

A list of books citing Big Deal

External links
99dewa.cc

1992 non-fiction books
Poker books